Arthur Louis Upton (born 20 June 1923) is a South African former cricketer who played first-class cricket for Natal from 1949 to 1956.

A left-handed middle-order batsman and leg-spin bowler, Upton was a regular in the Natal side for the four seasons from 1951-52 to 1954-55. He made his only century in 1954-55, scoring 126 and adding 249 for the fifth wicket with Roy McLean when Natal defeated Orange Free State by an innings.

References

External links

 Arthur Upton at CricketArchive

1923 births
Living people
Cricketers from Pietermaritzburg
South African cricketers
KwaZulu-Natal cricketers